Erwitte is a town in the district of Soest, in North Rhine-Westphalia, Germany.

Geography
Erwitte is situated approximately 8 km south of Lippstadt and 15 km east of Soest.

Neighbouring municipalities
 Lippstadt
 Geseke
 Rüthen
 Anröchte
 Bad Sassendorf

Division of the town
After the local government reforms of 1975 Erwitte consists of 15 districts:
 Erwitte (6510 inhabitants)
 Eikeloh (518 inhabitants)
 Merklinghausen/Wiggeringhausen (179 inhabitants)
 Horn-Millinghausen (894 inhabitants)
 Berenbrock (309 inhabitants)
 Seringhausen (65 inhabitants)
 Stirpe (1079 inhabitants)
 Ebbinghausen (201 inhabitants)
 Böckum (209 inhabitants)
 Völlinghausen (811 inhabitants)
 Schallern (291 inhabitants)
 Norddorf (159 inhabitants)
 Schmerlecke (732 inhabitants)
 Weckinghausen (67 inhabitants)
 Bad Westernkotten (4097 inhabitants)

International relations

Erwitte is twinned with:
  Aken (Germany)

History
Officially the town of Erwitte is mentioned in the year 836 for the first time and the medieval architecture can still be seen in the town center.

Industry
Erwitte is home to a thriving cement industry which, together with the heating valve company Heimeier, make up the largest companies in the area.

Sons and daughters of the town

 Friedrich Blumenröhr (born 1936), jurist, former chairman at the Federal Court
 Ulrich Cyran (born 1956), actor and lecturer
 Christof Rasche (born 1962), politician (FDP)
 Wolfgang Schäfers (born 1965), owner of the chair for real estate management at the University of Regensburg

People who are connected to the place
 Jodocus Boget († 1630), Erwitt pastor, burned for witchcraft on the pyre
 Heinrich Gersmeier (nickname: Schäfer Heinrich) (born 1966), farmer and singer from Völlinghausen

References

External links
 Official site 

Soest (district)